Come Dancing with The Kinks: The Best of 1977-1986 is a double album compilation by the Kinks, released on Arista Records in 1986. It contains thirteen tracks released as singles, only one of which did not also appear on album, and six album tracks. Every one of the band's seven albums released by Arista during the time period indicated is represented here. Designed specifically for the American market, it peaked at No. 159 on the Billboard 200 and failed to chart in the United Kingdom. A version for compact disc was issued in 2000 by Koch Records. Liner notes are by John Swenson, and the original recordings were produced by Ray Davies.

Content
This album comprises a survey of the band's output during their second period of commercial success after their early hits of the mid-1960s, this success predominantly in the United States. After four low-selling concept albums for their previous label, RCA Records, their contract was not renewed. In 1976 they signed with a company recently launched by ex-Columbia Records head Clive Davis, Arista, making one live and six studio albums for the label during a stay of a decade. In an effort to reverse diminishing cash flow, the band jettisoned the horn players, back-up singers, and the theatricality of the mid-1970s work and embraced the arena rock styles of the period. Ray Davies decamped to New York and worked to write songs with the commercial American market in mind:

I started working with Clive. I think Sleepwalker was an attempt to make it more palatable to radio and that's why Clive wanted to get involved. I was working with him very closely in those days. I rented an apartment in New York, and I would take my demo tapes into his office, he'd play the songs and make comments, and I would go back and work on them.

Of the songs on the album, "A Rock 'N' Roll Fantasy," "Come Dancing," and "Don't Forget to Dance" made the Top 40 on the Billboard Hot 100, with two just missing at #41: "(Wish I Could Fly Like) Superman" and "Do It Again." Six consecutive albums covered by this compilation —  Sleepwalker, Misfits, Low Budget, One for the Road, Give the People What They Want, and State of Confusion — all placed in the top 15 on the Billboard 200. The band left the label by 1986 for their next album, Think Visual.

The original 1986 CD version varies from the original LP release, removing Sleepwalker, Catch Me Now I'm Falling, and Misfits entirely. This version also has the longer album version of Don't Forget to Dance. Aside from the removal of those three tracks, the running order is maintained. These changes result in a new runtime of 69:53.

The 2000 reissue changes the album considerably. It replaces the singles versions of "Catch Me Now I'm Falling," "Sleepwalker," "Misfits," and "Don't Forget to Dance" with the longer album versions, replaces the single of "(Wish I Could Fly Like) Superman" with the 12" disco mix, deletes the intro to "Lola" and the live version of "Celluloid Heroes," deletes "Juke Box Music," "Long Distance," and "Heart of Gold," and adds "A Gallon of Gas," "Full Moon," and "Good Day." It also alters the running order.

All songs were written by Ray Davies, except for "Living on a Thin Line" by Dave Davies. First release as single or on album indicated by catalog number or title.

Track listing

Side one

Side two

Side three

Side four

2000 compact disc reissue

References

External links
The Official Ray Davies Web Site

The Kinks compilation albums
1986 compilation albums
Reprise Records compilation albums